Mimi Tanasorn Chindasook (born February 7, 1995 in Bangkok, Thailand) is a Thai figure skater. She is a three-time Thai national champion and qualified to the free skate at two Four Continents Championships.

Programs

Competitive highlights 
JGP: Junior Grand Prix

References

External links 

 

Mimi Tanasorn Chindasook
1995 births
Living people
Mimi Tanasorn Chindasook
Figure skaters at the 2011 Asian Winter Games